Into the Unknown: Making Frozen II is a 2020 documentary series about Disney's animated film Frozen II, which premiered in November 2019. Its six episodes follow the production crew and voice actors of Frozen II in the film's final year of development. This  includes the story development and reworking of the song "Show Yourself", the variety of different roles in the animation process, the songwriting and orchestral arrangements, and the post-production process. It was directed by Megan Harding, who was previously involved with a 2014 documentary on the making of the 2013 film Frozen, and released on the streaming service Disney+.

The documentary was produced by Lincoln Square Productions. Harding aimed to represent the production process honestly and the crew filmed for 115 days. They frequently flew between New York City, where they worked, and Los Angeles, where Frozen II was produced at Walt Disney Animation Studios, with some additional filming at the homes of individual crew members. The series received positive critical reception.

Cast

Production crew
 Chris Buck, director
 Jennifer Lee, screenwriter and director
 Kristen Anderson-Lopez, songwriter
 Robert "Bobby" Lopez, songwriter
 Peter Del Vecho, producer
 Michael Giaimo, production designer
 Malerie Walters, animator
 David Metzger, song arranger and orchestrator, score orchestrator

Voice actors
 Kristen Bell, voice actor for Anna
 Idina Menzel, voice actor for Elsa
 Josh Gad, voice actor for Olaf
 Jonathan Groff, voice actor for Kristoff
 Sterling K. Brown, voice actor for Lieutenant Mattias, an Arendelle soldier
 Evan Rachel Wood, voice actor for Queen Iduna, the mother of Anna and Elsa

Production
In 2014, Australian filmmaker Megan Harding met the main production crew of the 2013 Disney film Frozen while working on a television special for American Broadcasting Company (ABC) a year after the film's release. Production on the sequel Frozen II began in 2014. In December 2018, working with Lincoln Square Productions, Harding began documenting its filmmaking process. She and most of the crew flew between New York City, where they worked, and Los Angeles for the majority of filming. Covering the last year of production, the crew recorded 1,300 hours of footage across 115 days of shooting. The local crew filmed the Lopezes from their New York City apartment, and footage of their meetings with other production crew was variously captured from one or both sides of the conversation or from the teleconferencing technology directly.

Harding aimed to represent the process honestly and detail "the personal investment and creative struggle", rather than making "a DVD extra". The crew had to select aspects of the production to focus on, such as the development of "Show Yourself". Harding did not plan to include mention of Buck's loss of his son Ryder, but Buck brought it up himself, unexpectedly, and the filming crew was in tears by the end of the conversation. Though there were meetings in which Buck suggested it was "not a good day for cameras", the camera crew only left the room once during the year, in a meeting following the film's first screening to a family audience. Peter Del Vecho later said that the crew of Frozen II wanted to "show the world" the size of the crew and "the hard work it takes to put these films together", though he found it a "tough process" to have the documentary crew filming for a year. Josh Gad experienced self-consciousness, as Olaf's dialogue and singing were developed with "experiment and play". Lee found it enjoyable to show the crew how animation worked; she said of the "very intense" story room that it was harder to be filmed, but that the crew "were very patient with us".

The documentary features the song "See the Sky", which was cut from the final film but not released in the soundtrack. Harding's favorite scene which was cut from the series was Giaimo discussing what he viewed as the crew's "passion, dedication, and specific OCD-like tendencies" while trimming his hedges to resemble the shape of trees in Frozen. The documentary omits any mention of John Lasseter, the studio's chief creative officer before Lee who left the role after reports of him perpetrating sexual misconduct against employees in his position at Disney. It also does not cover the production's consultations with the Sámi people over their representation in the film, which largely occurred prior to the final year of production.

Episodes

Release

In April 2019, it was announced that a companion documentary series would be launched on the Disney+ streaming service within its first year entitled Into the Unknown: Making Frozen II. Frozen II was released in November 2019. The documentary's first trailer premiered in June 2020 and the series was released on June 26, 2020. Radio Times held a live discussion with Buck, Unten, and Walters at 5p.m. BST on the day of its release. At the 2020 Annecy International Animation Film Festival, which was held online, the first episode of the documentary was made available from June 26 to June 28. Frozen II was added to Disney+ shortly afterward, on July 3.

Reception
Joel Keller of Decider reviewed the documentary positively, saying that it "doesn't suffer from the usual Disney self-promotional schtick" and was "a very informative series that shows that even the best animated features run into issues." Ethan Anderton of /Film reviewed it as "informative and fascinating". Anderton praised it for featuring "touching and crushingly honest moments" such as Bell's relation to "The Next Right Thing", and covering the "frustration" involved in adapting "Show Yourself." Nick Romano of Entertainment Weekly recommended it for demonstrating that "there's as much heart behind these films as there are on screen." 

Ed Potton of The Times rated the documentary 4 stars out of 5 stars, who said that "such honesty is still rare in Hollywood" and that the challenges faced by the staff make the "cheesy payoffs hit home." Drew Taylor of Collider rated the documentary an "A," calling it "thoroughly riveting and surprisingly honest." Taylor compared it favorably to Disney's previous behind-the-scenes releases for "showing the filmmakers at their most vulnerable, both personally and artistically." Melissa Camacho of Common Sense Media rated the series 3 out of 5 stars and found it to be a "heartfelt behind-the-scene" documentary that highlights the different stages of an animated film production.

References

Further reading

External links

 
 INTO THE UNKNOWN: MAKING FROZEN II on Rotten Tomatoes

2020s American documentary television series
2020 American television series debuts
2020 American television series endings
Disney+ original programming
Documentary television series about art
Works about Frozen (franchise)
Disney documentary films